Coralliophila parvula is a species of sea snail, a marine gastropod mollusc in the family Muricidae, the murex snails or rock snails.

Description
The length of the shell attains 5.75 mm.

Distribution
This marine species occurs off Madagascar.

References

Gastropods described in 2007
Coralliophila